HMS Curacoa was a 31-gun Tribune-class screw frigate launched on 13 April 1854 from Pembroke Dockyard.

She served in the Mediterranean Station between 1854 until 1857 and was in the Black Sea during the Crimean War. She was part of the Channel Squadron between 1857 until 1859. On 24 October 1858, Curacoa ran aground on the Pelican Reef, off Smyrna, Ottoman Empire. All on board were rescued. On 4 February 1859, Curacoa collided with the British merchant ship Fleta in the English Channel. She then was sent to North America and West Indies Station and served between 1859 until 1862. Afterward, she went to the Australia Station, where she remained until 1866. She was the flagship of the Australia Station from 20 April 1863 until May 1866, having had her armament reduced to 23 guns in 1863.

Curacoa Island, off the Queensland coast, is named after HMS Curacoa (1854)

During the invasion of Waikato, her company provided reinforcements for the Naval Brigade at Auckland, New Zealand on 2 October 1863. She was sent back to Britain in 1866 and was broken up in 1869.

See also
 European and American voyages of scientific exploration

Notes

References

1854 ships
Ships built in Pembroke Dock
Steam frigates of the Royal Navy
Maritime incidents in October 1858